The 2015 Città di Como Challenger was a professional tennis tournament played on clay courts. It was the tenth edition of the tournament which was part of the 2015 ATP Challenger Tour. It took place in Como, Italy, between 31 August and 6 September 2015.

Singles main-draw entrants

Seeds

 1 Rankings are as of August 24, 2015.

Other entrants
The following players received wildcards into the singles main draw:
  Andrea Basso
  Edoardo Eremin
  Gianluca Mager
  Pietro Licciardi

The following players received entry as an alternate into the singles main draw:
  Erik Crepaldi
  Fernando Romboli

The following players received entry as a special exempt into the singles main draw:
  Lorenzo Giustino

The following players received entry from the qualifying draw:
  Riccardo Bonadio
  Mate Delić 
  Lorenzo Sonego
  Carlos Gómez-Herrera

The following player received entry by a lucky loser spot:
  Maxime Teixeira

Champions

Singles

  Andrey Kuznetsov def.  Daniel Brands 6–4, 6–3

Doubles

 Gero Kretschmer /  Alexander Satschko def.  Kenny de Schepper /  Maxime Teixeira 7–6(7–3), 6–4

External links
Official website

Citta di Como Challenger
Città di Como Challenger
Città di Como Challenger
Città di Como Challenger
Città di Como Challenger